Ape in a Cape: An Alphabet of Odd Animals  is a 1952 children's picture book written and illustrated by Fritz Eichenberg. The book is a rhyming alphabet book. The book was a recipient of a 1953 Caldecott Honor for its illustrations.

References

1952 children's books
American picture books
Caldecott Honor-winning works
Alphabet books